Bagdah Assembly constituency is an assembly constituency in North 24 Parganas district in the Indian state of West Bengal. It is reserved for scheduled castes.

Overview
As per orders of the Delimitation Commission, No. 94 Bagdah Assembly constituency (SC) is composed of the following: Bagdah community development block, and Gangrapota, Sundarpur and Tengra gram panchayats of Bangaon community development block.

Bagdah Assembly constituency (SC) is part of No. 14 Bangaon (Lok Sabha constituency) (SC). It was earlier part of Barasat (Lok Sabha constituency).

Members of Legislative Assembly

Election results

2021
In the 2021 election, Biswajit Das of BJP defeated his nearest rival Paritosh Kumar Saha of AITC.

2016
In the 2016 election, Dulal Bar of INC (Congress) defeated his nearest rival Upendra Nath Biswas of AITMC.

2011

.# Swing calculated on Congress+Trinamool Congress vote percentages taken together in 2006.

1977-2006
In the 2006 state assembly elections Dulal Chandra Bar of Trinamool Congress  won the Bagdah (SC) seat defeating his nearest rival Kamalakshmi Biswas of Forward Bloc. Contests in most years were multi cornered but only winners and runners are being mentioned. Kamalakshmi Biswas of Forward Bloc defeated Dulal Chandra Bar of Trinamool Congress in 2001, Kalidas Adhikari of Congress in 1996, Ram Chandra Bose of Congress in 1991. Apurba Lal Majumdar of Congress defeated Kamalakshmi Biswas of Forward Bloc in 1987. Kamalakshmi Biswas of Forward Bloc defeated Apurba Lal Majumdar of Congress in 1982 and Independent in 1977.

1962-1972
Apurba Lal Majumdar of Forward Bloc won in 1972, 1971, 1969 and 1967. Manindra Bhusan Biswas of Congress won in 1962. Prior to that the Bagdah seat was not there.

References

Assembly constituencies of West Bengal
Politics of North 24 Parganas district